The 2019–20 season was Watford's 121st year in their history and fifth consecutive season in the Premier League. They also participated in the FA Cup and the EFL Cup. The season covered the period from 1 July 2019 to 26 July 2020.

Javi Gracia was sacked on 7 September 2019, after a poor start to the season saw Watford bottom with just one point. He was replaced by former manager, Quique Sánchez Flores    However, on 1 December 2019, Flores was sacked after securing only a single victory in his second stint in charge. Nigel Pearson  was appointed manager on 6 December 2019 on a season-long contract. On 19 July 2020, Pearson was sacked with two games remaining in the 2019–20 season. Watford were seven points adrift at the bottom of the league when Pearson took charge, and three points above the relegation zone when he was sacked. Following Pearson's sacking, under interim manager Hayden Mullins, Watford went on to lose their remaining two games and were relegated.

Transfers

Transfers in

Loans out

Transfers out

Pre-season and friendlies
In June 2019. The Hornets confirmed their pre-season schedule.

Competitions

Premier League

League table

Results summary

Results by matchday

Matches
On 13 June 2019, the Premier League fixtures were announced.

FA Cup

The third round draw was made live on BBC Two from Etihad Stadium, Micah Richards and Tony Adams conducted the draw.

EFL Cup

The second round draw was made on 13 August 2019 following the conclusion of all but one first round matches. The third round draw was confirmed on 28 August 2019, live on Sky Sports. The draw for the fourth round was made on 25 September 2019.

Appearances and goals

|-
! colspan=14 style=background:#dcdcdc; text-align:center| Goalkeepers

|-
! colspan=14 style=background:#dcdcdc; text-align:center| Defenders

|-
! colspan=14 style=background:#dcdcdc; text-align:center| Midfielders

|-
! colspan=14 style=background:#dcdcdc; text-align:center| Forwards

|-
! colspan=14 style=background:#dcdcdc; text-align:center| Players transferred out during the season

References

Watford
Watford F.C. seasons